The 1867 Central Java earthquake occurred on June 10 at between 04:20 and 04:30 local time. It struck off the southern coast of the Indonesian island with an estimated moment magnitude of 7.8. Widespread devastation occurred in Central Java, where as many as 700 people were killed. The intermediate-depth intraslab earthquake did not cause a tsunami.

Tectonic setting
Off the southern coast of Java lies an active convergent boundary that separates the Sunda Plate to the north and the Australian Plate in the south. At the boundary, marked by the Sunda Trench, the northward-moving Australian Plate subducts beneath the Sunda Plate. The subduction zone is capable of generating earthquakes of up to magnitude 8.7, while the Australian Plate may also host deeper earthquakes within the downgoing lithosphere (intraslab earthquakes) beneath the coast of Java. The subduction zone produced two destructive earthquakes and tsunamis in 2006 and 1994. An intraslab earthquake in 2009 also caused severe destruction.

Earthquake
The mainshock may have been accompanied by a less intense but significant foreshock on May 17, 1865, and an aftershock on March 28, 1875, respectively. These events are thought to represent seismic unrest within the subducting Australian Plate. Simulation models of a shallow crustal and large subduction zone earthquake were inconsistent with the historical reports. The lack of an observed tsunami disproves the subduction zone earthquake theory, while the shallow crustal earthquake theory is not in alignment with the tectonic understanding of the island. Modelling an intraslab earthquake of magnitude 7.8 at a depth of  agrees with the reports of widespread, high-intensity, and heavy damage.

Damage

The earthquake was felt from Banten, in the western part of Java, to Negara, Bali, a length of 900 km. It was most destructive in the central and eastern parts of Java. An estimated Modified Mercalli intensity of VIII–IX (Severe–Violent) was assigned in Yogyakarta. Shaking was felt for over two minutes in some areas.

In Surakarta and Yogyakarta, approximately 372 homes were destroyed or heavily damaged. A total of 1,000 homes were destroyed. The Kraton Ngayogyakarta Hadiningrat was heavily damaged. Several buildings in the Taman Sari palace complex were destroyed. Water features in the area were drained. The damaged complex eventually became a place for squatters to reside in. The Sewu temple in Klaten suffered a complete collapse of its main dome structure. Despite the extent of damage, only five fatalities were reported, though it may be as high as 327, 500 or 700. In Surakarta, at least 236 people were killed. Twelve of the fatalities were Europeans. Four people were killed by collapsing stone construction at a camp in the Pekalongan Regency. Great damage was also reported in Bantul. At Salatiga, the earthquake caused a clock to stop at the time of its occurrence: 04:21, but the shaking lasted until 04:22.

On Mount Merapi, many landslides were triggered. Ground fissures were also observed. In the Java Sea, a seaquake was observed but there were no reports of a tsunami. Moderate damage to factory and industrial facilities was reported in Bandjardjawa. Effects from the quake were also felt on ships docked at Batavia and those located hundreds of miles away. Several houses collapsed in the Semarang Regency. In Surabaya, a church suffered cracks and a sugar factory was damaged.

Future hazard 
According to the simulation results, if an earthquake of the same intensity occurred today, it is estimated to cause about 60,000 deaths.

See also
List of earthquakes in Indonesia
List of historical earthquakes

References

Earthquakes in Indonesia
1867 in Southeast Asia
1867 earthquakes
Earthquakes in Java
Batavia, Dutch East Indies
Landslides in Indonesia
1860s in the Dutch East Indies
History of Java
1867 disasters in Oceania
19th-century disasters in Indonesia
1867 disasters in Asia